Nosratabad (also Romanized as Noşratābād) is a village in Ferdows Rural District, in the Central District of Shahriar County, Tehran Province, Iran. At the 2006 census, its population was 55, in 16 families.

References 

Populated places in Shahriar County